Mikael Sandberg may refer to:

 Mikael Sandberg (basketball), Finnish basketball player
 Mikael Sandberg (political scientist), Swedish political scientist
 Mikael Sandberg (ice hockey), Swedish ice hockey goaltender